Gonzalo Serrano Rodríguez (born 17 August 1994, in Madrid) is a Spanish cyclist, who currently rides for UCI WorldTeam . In August 2019, he was named in the startlist for the 2019 Vuelta a España.

When the 2022 Tour of Britain was cancelled after the death of Elizabeth II, Serrano, who had been leading, was declared the winner, defeating Tom Pidcock.

Major results

2016
 2nd Time trial, National Under-23 Road Championships
2018
 6th Classica da Arrabida
2019
 8th Overall Tour of Turkey
 8th Classica da Arrabida
2020
 1st  Mountains classification, Volta a la Comunitat Valenciana
 1st Stage 2 Vuelta a Andalucía
 6th La Drôme Classic
 10th Trofeo Matteotti
  Combativity award Stage 2 Vuelta a España
2021
 1st Stage 1 Vuelta a Andalucía
 3rd Vuelta a Murcia
 4th Road race, National Road Championships
 7th Prueba Villafranca - Ordiziako Klasika
 8th Trofeo Serra de Tramuntana
2022
 1st  Overall Tour of Britain
1st Stage 4
 3rd Grand Prix de Wallonie
2023
 9th Trofeo Andratx–Mirador D'es Colomer

Grand Tour general classification results timeline

References

External links

1994 births
Living people
Spanish male cyclists
Cyclists from Madrid